Vadlamudi Srinivas Mohan is an Indian visual effects designer, coordinator and supervisor known for his works primarily in Tamil and Telugu films. He is also known for his works in few Hindi, Kannada and Malayalam films.

Early life
Srinivas Mohan was born in Vijayawada, Andhra Pradesh, India. Before getting into visual effects industry in Chennai, Srinivas worked as an animator and computer programmer.

Career
Srinivas has received four National Film Awards for Best Special Effects for works such as Magic Magic (2003), Sivaji (2007), Enthiran (2010), and Baahubali: The Beginning (2015).

Filmography and awards

References

Living people
Telugu people
Tamil film editors
Telugu film editors
Kannada film editors
Visual effects artists
Special effects people
Artists from Vijayawada
Visual effects supervisors
21st-century Indian designers
Film editors from Andhra Pradesh
Best Special Effects National Film Award winners
Year of birth missing (living people)